Muhammad Mueenuddeen II was the sultan of the Maldives from 1886 to 1888. On 16th of December of 1887, he accepted British protection and the nation became a protectorate.

References

19th-century sultans of the Maldives
Year of death missing
Year of birth missing

Monarchs who abdicated